Strawberry Creek is a  long 3rd order tributary to the Banister River in Pittsylvania County, Virginia.

Course 
Strawberry Creek rises in a pond about 1 mile north of Swansonville, Virginia and then flows generally northeast to join the Banister River about 2.5 miles east of Banister.

Watershed 
Strawberry Creek drains  of area, receives about 46.0 in/year of precipitation, has a wetness index of 388.69, and is about 51% forested.

See also 
 List of Virginia Rivers

References 

Rivers of Virginia
Rivers of Pittsylvania County, Virginia
Tributaries of the Roanoke River